Fontaine-lès-Hermans is a commune in the Pas-de-Calais department in the Hauts-de-France region of France.

Geography
The largest nearby city is Bruay-la-Buissière, which is located 15 km southeast of the commune. It is surrounded by the communes Nédonchel, Westrehem and Fiefs.

Population

The inhabitants of the commune of Fontaine-lès-Hermans are referred to as Hermanifontains or Hermanifontaines (males or females) in French.

Places of interest
St. Clement Church, which dates from the seventeenth century

See also
Communes of the Pas-de-Calais department

References

Fontaineleshermans